On January 6, 1967, two Catholic pilgrimage buses plunged off a cliff near a reinforced timber bridge in the rural town of Indang, Cavite, Philippines, after colliding with each other on a mountainous road near the bridge. The accident killed more than 80 people, many of whom were women and children, and injured the remaining passengers, making it one of the worst road accidents and disasters in the world and the worst in Philippine history.

Background 
The Tuy–Indang segment (Balayan–Tuy and Naic–Indang Roads) of the Batangas–Cavite Interprovincial Road was constructed from the 1920s to the 1930s by the United States government to provide a direct link from the capital city of Manila to western Batangas.

Meanwhile, a wooden bridge with steel reinforcements (the accident site) was built to connect then-barrio Italaro, now a sitio located in Barangay Kayquit III, Indang town, to the adjacent Mendez town, both are separated by a river in the barrio's south.

Two years prior to the incident, more than 40 people had been killed on the same site. In 1965, two softdrink trailer trucks fell into the ravine. In 1966, an accident killed at least 9 people and injured 16 others. According to the Guinness Book of World Records, the worst previous road disaster took place in India five years prior.

In December 1966, about three weeks before the incident, a countrywide safety campaign against the so-called "rolling coffins" – a term used to refer to the buses – was launched by the government of the Philippines after a bus crashed into the gates of Malacañang Palace, the official residence of the president. In the provinces, bus rides were often compared to a rollercoaster ride due to several drivers driving at expressway speeds.

Accident

Events 
The buses involved were owned by Batangas Laguna Tayabas Bus Company (BLTB Co.) and were part of a convoy, consisting of 57 buses carrying devotees from the towns of Nasugbu, Tuy and Lian in Batangas to a church dedicated to the Santo Niño in the coastal town of Ternate, Cavite to celebrate the annual feast of Epiphany.

At dawn of January 6, 1967, the convoy left from Batangas. Later in the morning, while traversing their route for Indang, the ninth bus (no. 522) lost its brakes while overtaking other vehicles; collided to the back of the eighth bus (no. 318) upon reaching a curve near Italaro bridge. Strong impact was enough for the buses to fall off a  ravine.

Response 
It took long for rescue and retrieval efforts; joined there were the Philippine Air Force and United States Navy. While the latter sent out rescue teams from their base at Sangley Point in Cavite City to the crash site, their helicopters from Manila arrived to the site only after six hours as operations were almost finished.

The wounded, many of them critically, were brought to various hospitals in Cavite, while some were transferred to Manila due to lacking medicine supplies. As local governments requested, assistance from the Department of Health and other national government agencies, for the treatment to the victims, only came a day late, and the ambulances came at early afternoon.

President Ferdinand Marcos deployed a team of doctors and social welfare workers to the hospitals where the survivors were taken. The Philippine Constabulary (PC) ordered the closure of the Batangas–Cavite Interprovincial Road to prevent looting of the wreckage.

Casualties 
The Associated Press initially stated an estimate of more than 115 deaths and reported 15 survivors in the accident. After the response operations, United Press International reported only at least 84; more than 60 other persons were injured, at least 30 of them critically.

One outlet reported otherwise 83 deaths, 57 injuries, and three were unaccounted for.

All immediate deaths were due to their bodies being hit by twisted steel reinforcements and branches of trees in the area. Unclaimed bodies were brought to Indang Health Center. Seventy-six of the dead passengers were identified, including a former Tuy municipal mayor. On those injured, 48, including two bus conductors, were reportedly brought to various medical facilities in Cavite and seven were transferred to Philippine General Hospital.

Investigation 
There are conflicting reports on the number of passengers. While some sources suggest that there were more than 130, it was reported that nearly 300 people, mostly Catholic pilgrims, have been aboard the two buses, with about 150 people on each.

According to preliminary reports, mechanical defect and negligence were the primary cause of the accident.

Lolito de Castro of Batangas, survived driver of bus no. 318, was arrested at a clinic in the province wherein he was treated. Investigation led by Col. Rizalino Garcia, Cavite PC Commander, revealed that de Castro jumped out of the bus as he was unable to control it, and, as admitted by de Castro, later went into hiding in fear of retaliation from victims' relatives. Charges of "multiple homicide" and "multiple physical injuries through reckless imprudence" were filed against him.

Reaction 
On January 8, 1967, President Marcos, upon learning initial reports that the accident was due to either drivers' negligence or the buses' defective brakes, ordered the Public Service Commission to cancel the franchise of BLTB Co. if found liable, otherwise, to take other disciplinary actions against the company.

On January 11, Pope Paul VI extended his condolences and gave his paternal blessing to the families and relatives of the victims through a cable released by Archbishop Carlo Martini, the apostolic nuncio to the Philippines, to the press.

Aftermath 

After the accident, it was said that apparently, the government and the Department of Public Works and Highways (DPWH) had intentionally abandoned the section of the road leading to the accident site to realign it elsewhere, allowing vegetation to reclaim it. The road was slightly realigned to the east and a new bridge was built with it.

Notes

References 

1967 in the Philippines
1967 road incidents
Bus incidents in the Philippines
History of Batangas
History of Cavite
1967 disasters in the Philippines